The modern constellation Hydra lies across two of the quadrants, symbolized by the Azure Dragon of the East (東方青龍, Dōng Fāng Qīng Lóng) and the Vermilion Bird of the South (南方朱雀, Nán Fāng Zhū Què), that divide the sky in traditional Chinese uranography.

The name of the western constellation in modern Chinese is 長蛇座 (cháng shé zuò), which means "the long snake constellation".

Stars
The map of Chinese constellation in constellation Hydra area consists of:

See also
Chinese astronomy
Traditional Chinese star names
Chinese constellations

References

External links
Hydra – Chinese associations
 香港太空館研究資源
 中國星區、星官及星名英譯表
 天象文學
 台灣自然科學博物館天文教育資訊網
 中國古天文
 中國古代的星象系統

Astronomy in China
Hydra (constellation)